The following is a list of presidents of the entertainment division for the NBC television network.

References